Irvin Buhlalu (born 21 November 1974) is a South African boxer. He competed in the men's lightweight event at the 1996 Summer Olympics.

Professional boxing record

|-
| style="text-align:center;" colspan="8"|27 Wins (27 knockouts, 16 decisions), 9 Losses (6 knockouts, 3 decision), 1 Draws
|-  style="text-align:center; background:#e3e3e3;"
|  style="border-style:none none solid solid; "|Result
|  style="border-style:none none solid solid; "|Record
|  style="border-style:none none solid solid; "|Opponent
|  style="border-style:none none solid solid; "|Type
|  style="border-style:none none solid solid; "|Rounds
|  style="border-style:none none solid solid; "|Date
|  style="border-style:none none solid solid; "|Location
|  style="border-style:none none solid solid; "|Notes
|- align=center
|Loss
|27–9
|align=left| Paul Kamanga
|KO
|1 (8)
|22 March 2014
|align=left| 
|align=left|
|- align=center
|Loss
|27–8
|align=left| Thompson Mokwana
|TKO
|7 (12)
|13 December 2013
|align=left| 
|align=left|
|- align=center
|Win
|27-7
|align=left| Anelisa Gungqisa
|TKO
|4 (8)
|22 September 2013
|align=left| 
|align=left|
|- align=center
|Win
|26-7
|align=left| Thulani Mbatha
|TKO
|3 (0)
|22 September 2012
|align=left| 
|align=left|
|- align=center
|Win
|25-7
|align=left| Lungisa Jikani
|TKO
|5 (6)
|28 October 2011
|align=left| 
|align=left|
|- align=center
|Loss
|24–7
|align=left| Vusumzi Bokolo
|UD
|6 (6)
|2 August 2009
|align=left| 
|align=left|
|- align=center
|Win
|24-6
|align=left| Skhumbuzo Khoso
|PTS
|10 (10)
|29 November 2008
|align=left| 
|align=left|
|- align=center
|Loss
|23–6
|align=left| Amon Baloyi
|KO
|4 (12)
|4 May 2008
|align=left| 
|align=left|
|- align=center
|Win
|23-5
|align=left| Benedict Dlamini
|SD
|12 (12)
|28 September 2007
|align=left| 
|align=left|
|- align=center
|Win
|22-5
|align=left| Khululekile Sibeko
|MD
|12 (12)
|3 June 2007
|align=left| 
|align=left|
|- align=center
|Win
|21-5
|align=left| Benedict Dlamini
|SD
|12 (12)
|11 November 2006
|align=left| 
|align=left|
|- align=center
|Win
|20-5
|align=left| Simphiwe Joni
|TKO
|11 (12)
|15 September 2006
|align=left| 
|align=left|
|- align=center
|Win
|19-5
|align=left| Benedict Dlamini
|UD
|12 (12)
|5 May 2006
|align=left| 
|align=left|
|- align=center
|Win
|18-5
|align=left| Siviwe Ntshingana
|UD
|12 (12)
|18 November 2005
|align=left| 
|align=left|
|- align=center
|Win
|17-5
|align=left| Sikhulule Sidzumo
|SD
|12 (12)
|15 July 2005
|align=left| 
|align=left|
|- align=center
|Win
|16–5
|align=left| Ncedisile Kafile
|PTS
|6 (6)
|23 October 2004
|align=left| 
|align=left|
|- align=center
|Loss
|15–5
|align=left| Isaac Hlatshwayo
|KO
|6 (12)
|19 December 2003
|align=left| 
|align=left|
|- align=center
|Win
|15–4
|align=left| Mzukisi Mgidi
|PTS
|8 (8)
|2 August 2003
|align=left| 
|align=left|
|- align=center
|Win
|14–4
|align=left| Nasele Mkhatshane
|KO
|1 (0)
|14 December 2002
|align=left| 
|align=left|
|- align=center
|Loss
|13–4
|align=left| Martin Jacobs
|TKO
|9 (12)
|6 July 2002
|align=left| 
|align=left|
|- align=center
|Win
|13–3
|align=left| Nkosinathi Moholo
|KO
|6 (6)
|2 February 2002
|align=left| 
|align=left|
|- align=center
|Win
|12–3
|align=left| Melikhaya August
|KO
|1 (12)
|21 July 2001
|align=left| 
|align=left|
|- align=center
|Win
|11–3
|align=left| Bheki Lubisi
|TKO
|2 (6)
|9 May 2001
|align=left| 
|align=left|
|- align=center
|Win
|10–3
|align=left| Nkosinathi Mthimkulu
|KO
|1 (6)
|25 February 2001
|align=left| 
|align=left|
|- align=center
|Loss
|9–3
|align=left| Mzonke Fana
|UD
|12 (12)
|6 August 2000
|align=left| 
|align=left|
|- align=center
|Loss
|9–2
|align=left| Mzonke Fana
|UD
|12 (12)
|6 February 2000
|align=left| 
|align=left|
|- align=center
|Win
|9–1
|align=left| Mabuti Sahluko
|KO
|2 (6)
|30 May 1999
|align=left| 
|align=left|
|- align=center
|Win
|8–1
|align=left| Danile Botman
|PTS
|4 (4)
|20 April 1999
|align=left| 
|align=left|
|- align=center
|Win
|7–1
|align=left| Jacob Mkwanazi
|TKO
|2 (6)
|29 September 1998
|align=left| 
|align=left|
|- align=center
|Win
|6–1
|align=left| Edward Dlamini
|PTS
|6 (6)
|28 July 1998
|align=left| 
|align=left|
|- align=center
|style="background:#abcdef;"|Draw
|5–1
|align=left| Matthews Zulu
|PTS
|6 (6)
|30 June 1998
|align=left| 
|align=left|
|- align=center
|Loss
|5–1
|align=left| George Mbatha
|TKO
|6 (6)
|7 December 1997
|align=left| 
|align=left|
|- align=center
|Win
|5–0
|align=left| Phapama Danisa
|TKO
|4 (6)
|8 November 1997
|align=left| 
|align=left|
|- align=center
|Win
|4–0
|align=left| Vincent Mafatshe
|KO
|1 (-)
|21 September 1997
|align=left| 
|align=left|
|- align=center
|Win
|3–0
|align=left| Nyaniso Mtati
|TKO
|1 (-)
|24 August 1997
|align=left| 
|align=left|
|- align=center
|Win
|2–0
|align=left| Sithembiso Jili
|KO
|1 (6)
|15 June 1997
|align=left| 
|align=left|
|- align=center
|Win
|1–0
|align=left| Stanley Zondi
|TKO
|2 (-)
|1 June 1997
|align=left| 
|align=left|

References

1974 births
Living people
South African male boxers
Olympic boxers of South Africa
Boxers at the 1996 Summer Olympics
Commonwealth Games competitors for South Africa
Boxers at the 1994 Commonwealth Games
African Games gold medalists for South Africa
African Games medalists in boxing
Competitors at the 1995 All-Africa Games
Sportspeople from Durban
Lightweight boxers